This is a list of museums in Ukraine. It contains details of museums within Crimea, which was annexed by Russia in 2014, and is now administered as part of the Russian Federation. Many of these museums are at risk in 2022 due to the Russian invasion of Ukraine.

Cherkasy Oblast
Taras Hill

Crimea
Aivazovsky National Art Gallery
Feodosia Money Museum
Livadia Palace
Museum of Vera Mukhina
Naval museum complex Balaklava
Simferopol Art Museum
Vorontsov Palace (Alupka)
White Dacha

Chernihiv
Chernihiv Regional Art Museum
Chernihiv Museum of Military History
Chernigiv State Literary-Memorial Museum of Mykhailo Kotsiubynskyi

Ivano-Frankivsk Oblast
Art Museum (Ivano-Frankivsk)
Pysanka Museum
Ratusha, Ivano-Frankivsk

Kharkiv Oblast
M. F. Sumtsov Kharkiv Historical Museum
Kharkiv Art Museum

Kyiv

Kyiv Oblast
Cossack Village (Stetsivka)
Mezhyhirya Residence

Kirovohrad Oblast
Khutir Nadia
Strategic missile forces museum in Ukraine

Lviv Oblast
Brody Museum of History and District Ethnography
Drohobych Museum
Museum of Folk Architecture and Life
Korniakt Palace
Lviv Arsenal
Borys Voznytsky Lviv National Art Gallery. Oversees:
 Lozinsky Palace, the main building, on 3 Stefanyka street
 Potocki Palace, 15 Kopernyka street
 Boim Chapel, 1 Katedralna Square
 Museum of Ancient Ukrainian Books, 15a Kopernyka street, near Potocki Palace
 Rusalka Dnistrova Museum, 40 Kopernyka street
 Church of St. John the Baptist, 1 Pidhirna street
 Johann Georg Pinsel Museum, 2 Mytna street
 Memorial Museum-workshop of Teodozia Bryzh, 5 Martovycha street
 Mykhailo Dzyndra Museum of Modern Sculpture, 16 Muzeyna street, Briukhovychi
 Olesko Castle, in Olesko
 Pidhirtsi Castle, in Pidhirtsi
 Markiyan Shashkevych Memorial Museum in Pidlyssia, Zolochiv Raion.
 Zolochiv Castle Memorial Museum, in Zolochiv
 Hetman Ivan Vyhovsky Museum, in Ruda, Stryi Raion.
 Pyatychanska Tower, in Pyatychany, Zhydachiv Raion
 Museum of Zhydachiv Land, in Zhydachiv.

Andrey Sheptytsky National Museum of Lviv
Pharmacy Museum, Lviv
Zolochiv Castle

Mykolaiv Oblast
Mykolayiv Regional Museum of Local History
Regional Museum of local lore of Mykolaiv
The Museum of Shipbuilding and Fleet
Strategic missile forces museum in Ukraine
The V. V. Vereshchagin Mykolaiv Art Museum

Odesa Oblast
Museum of the Cinema (Odesa, Ukraine)
Odesa Archeological Museum
Odesa Art Museum
Odesa Numismatics Museum
Odesa Pushkin Museum
Odesa Museum of the Regional History

Poltava Oblast
Poltava Art Museum

Rivne Oblast
Ostroh Castle

Sumy Oblast
Lebedyn Municipal Art Museum
Museum of Banking history in the Sumy oblast and the History of Ukrainian Money
Nikanor Onatsky Regional Art Museum in Sumy

Ternopil Oblast
Ternopil Regional Art Museum
Zbarazh Castle

Vinnytsia Oblast
Suvorov Museum, Timanivka

Volyn Oblast
Volodymyr-Volynsky Historical Museum

Zakarpattia Oblast
Museum of Folk Architecture and Life, Uzhgorod
Palanok Castle

Zaporizhia Oblast
Khortytsia

Zhytomyr Oblast
Museum of Ukrainian home icons
Radomysl Castle
Sergei Pavlovich Korolyov Museum of Cosmonautics

See also

Lists of museums
Tourism in Ukraine
Culture of Ukraine
List of art museums and galleries in Ukraine

References

Museums
 
Ukraine
Museums
Museums
Ukraine